Minuscule 652 (in the Gregory-Aland numbering of New Testament manuscripts), ε1095 (in the von Soden numbering of New Testament manuscripts), is a Greek minuscule manuscript of the New Testament, written on parchment. Using the study of comparative writing styles (palaeography), it has been assigned to the 10th century. The manuscript has complex contents. Biblical scholar Frederick H. A. Scrivener labelled it as 875.

Description 

The manuscript is a codex (precursor to the modern book), containing the text of the four Gospels, on 305 parchment leaves (size ). It is written in one column per page, 20 lines per page.

Text 

The Greek text of the codex is considered a representative of the Byzantine text-type. The text-types are groups of different New Testament manuscripts which share specific or generally related readings, which then differ from each other group, and thus the conflicting readings can separate out the groups. These are then used to determine the original text as published; there are three main groups with names: Alexandrian, Western, and Byzantine. Its relationship with other manuscripts is not commented on by textual critic Kurt Aland, who did not place it in any Category of his New Testament manuscripts classification system. According to the Claremont Profile Method it represents textual family Π in Luke 1, and K in Luke 10 and Luke 20.

Biblical scholar Silva Lake discovered it represents the text of Family 1 in Mark 4:20-6:24, and in the rest of Mark it coincides with the text of Family Π.

A later hand has added to John 8:8 in the margin the following:

(sins of every one of them).
This textual variant is also found in Codex Nanianus (U), and the minuscules Minuscule 73, 95, 331, 364, 700, 782, 1592, and some Armenian manuscripts. Minuscule 264 includes this textual variant in John 8:6.

History 

The manuscript belonged to Otto of Greece and was brought to Germany in 1879. Biblical scholar Caspar René Gregory  saw the manuscript in 1887, and dated it to the 10th or 11th century. The manuscript is currently dated by the INTF to the 10th century. Gregory. The manuscript is housed at the Bavarian State Library (shelf number Gr. 594), in Munich.

See also 

 Family Π
 List of New Testament minuscules
 Biblical manuscript
 Textual criticism

References 

Greek New Testament minuscules
10th-century biblical manuscripts